Hidden is a Welsh television drama serial, created by Mark Andrew and Ed Talfan. It was initially broadcast in Welsh on the Welsh-language channel S4C under its Welsh name Craith. The bilingual version of the series, under the English name Hidden, was broadcast on BBC One Wales and BBC Four. The Welsh-language versions of the first two series aired on S4C in 2018 and 2019, respectively, with the third and final series beginning on 10 October 2021. The English-language version of the third and final series aired in April 2022.

Overview 

Leading actress Sian Reese-Williams commented that the series was more of a "personal drama" than a crime series, because of the multiple human stories involved, including those of the victims, the families of the victims, and the criminal protagonist. The format concentrates on "why" rather than "who" committed the crime.

Cast

Main
 Sian Reese-Williams as Detective Inspector (later Detective Chief Inspector) Cadi John, a former soldier
 Siôn Alun Davies as Detective Sergeant Owen Vaughan, a local boy who grew up on a tough housing estate in Caernarfon
 Nia Roberts as Dr Elin Jones, Cadi's older sister, a hospital doctor
 Lois Meleri-Jones as Lowri Driscoll, a district nurse (main, series 1; guest, series 2)
 Rhodri Meilir as Dylan Harris, a labourer (Series 1)
 Gillian Elisa as Iona Harris, Dylan's mother (Series 1)
 Gwyneth Keyworth as Megan Ruddock, a first-year psychology student at Bangor University (Series 1)
 Ian Saynor as Huw John, Cadi's terminally ill father, a retired detective superintendent (Series 1)
 Owen Arwyn as Alun Pryce, father of Mali Pryce (Series 1)
 Greta James as Mali Pryce (Series 1)
 Annes Elwy as Mia Owen, schoolgirl (Series 2)
 Steffan Cennydd as Connor Pritchard, schoolboy (Series 2)
 Lisa Victoria as Catrin Pritchard, Connor's mother (Series 2)
 Siôn Eifion as Lee Williams, a cousin of Mia (Series 2)
 Bryn Fôn as Hefin Mathews, owner of a rural garage and petrol station (Series 2)
 Lois Elenid as Beca Mathews, Hefin's daughter (Series 2)
 Owain Gwynn as Siôn Wells, Hefin's tenant opposite the garage (Series 2)
 Justin Melluish as Glyn Thomas, a pigeon fancier who has Down's syndrome (Series 3)
 Sion Ifan as Siôn Thomas, Glyn's younger brother, a labourer (Series 3)
 Elen Rhys as Hannah Lewis, Glyn's employer and Siôn's ex-girlfriend (Series 3)

Recurring
 Megan Llŷn as Bethan John, younger sister of Cadi and Elin
 Victoria Pugh as Detective Superintendent Susan Lynn
 Lowri Izzard as Police Constable Mari James (Series 1–2)
 Garmon Rhys as Police Constable Ryan Davies
 Sarah Tempest as Detective Constable Alys Mitchell
 Melangell Dolma as Sam Shepherd, Owen's girlfriend, a solicitor (Series 1–2)
 Lara Catrin as Lea Pryce, younger sister of Mali Pryce (Series 1 and 3)
 Elodie Wilton as Nia Harris, Dylan's ten-year-old daughter (Series 1)
 Rhodri Sion as Ieuan Rhys, a local drug dealer and hard man in Llanberis (Series 1)
 Mark Lewis Jones as Endaf Elwy, imprisoned for the murder of his niece, Anna Williams (Series 1)
 Ioan Hefin as Matthew Heston, neighbour of the Harris family (Series 1)
 Mali Ann Rees as Ffion, Megan's best friend (Series 1)
 Mali Tudno Jones as Dr Rachel West, the local pathologist, who becomes Cadi's girlfriend (Series 2–3)
 Ffion Dafis as Kelly Owen, Mia's mother (Series 2)
 Jac Jones as Liam Pritchard, Connor's younger brother (Series 2)
 Dyfrig Evans as Glyn Jones, Kelly's boyfriend (Series 2)
 Manon Prysor as Rhian Jenkins, estranged daughter of murder victim Geraint Elis (Series 2)
 Gruffydd Owain Wyn Jones as Jason Williams, Lee's older brother (Series 2)
 Mark Flanagan as Karl Lewis, a power station worker who once accused Geraint Elis of child abuse (Series 2)
 Sion Pritchard as James Rhys, a former youth worker (Series 2)
 Llion Williams as Ifan Jenkins, Rhian's controlling husband (Series 2)
 Nia Hâf as Lois Jones, Elin's teenage daughter (Series 2)
 Gwawr Loader as Police Constable Gwawr Daniels (Series 3)
 Rhodri Evan as Father Richard McEwan, the local Catholic parish priest (Series 3)
 Dritan Kastrati as Piotr Korecki, a Polish labourer (Series 3)
 Oliver Jones as Ifan Williams, a murdered farmer (Series 3)
 Rhian Blythe as Siwan Williams, wife of Ifan Williams, a murdered farmer (Series 3)
 Lewsyn Blaidd Watts as Guto Williams, young son of Ifan and Siwan Williams (Series 3)
 Gwen Ellis as Mair Williams, mother of Ifan Williams (Series 3)
 William Thomas as Dafydd O'Connell, former farmhand on the Williams farm (Series 3)

Filming and release 
Filming took place in 2017 in Bangor and Snowdonia. The series was the second project on which Andrew and Talfan collaborated, following Hinterland. It was first broadcast as Craith, in Welsh, on S4C on 7 January 2018 and aired weekly. A bi-lingual version of the series aired, mainly in English, on BBC One Wales and BBC Four in June 2018 under the title of Hidden.

Hidden was renewed for a second series in February 2019, set largely in Blaenau Ffestiniog. It broadcast first on S4C on 17 November 2019.

In January 2021, the BBC announced that a third series had been commissioned to air later in the year, with Sian Reese-Williams and Siôn Alun Davies returning in their roles of, respectively, DCI Cadi John and DS Owen Vaughan. The series comprises six episodes.

Episodes

Airdates listed as per the S4C broadcast. English subtitled repeats were broadcast at 22:30 on Fridays. A bi-lingual version aired six months later on BBC One Wales on Tuesdays, being shown nationally on BBC Four on Saturday evenings.

Series 3 was broadcast on BBC4 and iPlayer from Saturday 19 March 2022.

Series 1 (2018)

Series 2 (2019)

Series 3 (2022)

Reception
The Guardian compared Hidden favourably to the Swedish Scandi-noir drama The Bridge, describing it as one of the "current powerhouse run of Wales-set dramas", with "scenes in Welsh to provide that sweet Nordic subtitles hit". It went on to say "Hidden is perhaps the most confidently stylish and stylised yet. As well as a gorgeously gothic credits sequence, it features handsomely brooding landscapes, offbeat interior locations that go far beyond the usual bland corridors/offices of cop drama, and an ominous, skin-prickling soundtrack skilfully employed to heighten the sense of dread."

References

External links
 
 

2018 British television series debuts
2010s British crime drama television series
2010s British mystery television series
2010s Welsh television series
BBC Cymru Wales television shows
BBC television dramas
British detective television series
S4C original programming
Television shows set in Wales